Papyrus 122 (in the Gregory-Aland numbering), designated by 𝔓122, is an early copy of the New Testament in Greek. It is a papyrus manuscript of the Gospel of John.

Description 

Only two pieces from one leaf have survived to the present day. The surviving texts of John are verses 21:11-14,22-24, they are in a fragmentary condition. The manuscript paleographically had been assigned to the 4th or 5th century (INTF). It was written by irregular hand.

It uses nomina sacra. Name Ιησους (Jesus) is abbreviated to ΙΗΣ (majority of manuscripts used abbreviation ΙΣ). Number "one hundred and fifty-three" is written in abbreviation — ΡΝΓ. 

The Greek text of this codex probably is a representative of the Alexandrian text-type.

Text 

In John 21:14 omitted word Ιησους (Jesus), just like in Codex Washingtonianus, rest of the manuscripts contain this word, usually with an article (ο Ιησους). 

 

In red colour missing letters.

Location 
The manuscript currently is housed at the Papyrology Rooms of the Sackler Library at Oxford with the shelf number P. Oxy. 4806.

See also 

 List of New Testament papyri
 Oxyrhynchus Papyri

References

Further reading 

 R. Hatzilambrou, P. J. Parsons, J. Chapa The Oxyrhynchus Papyri LXXI (London: 2007), pp. 11–14.

External links

Images 
 P.Oxy.LXIV 4806 from Papyrology at Oxford's "POxy: Oxyrhynchus Online"; only page recto is accessible.

Official registration 
 "Continuation of the Manuscript List" Institute for New Testament Textual Research, University of Münster. Retrieved April 9, 2008

New Testament papyri
4th-century biblical manuscripts
Gospel of John papyri